The Ministry of National Defense (MND) is a department within the government of South Korea (ROK) and responsible for the military branches of South Korea.

History
The Ministry of National Defense was established on 15 August 1948 and located at Yongsan-dong, Yongsan District, Seoul. It was established following the foundation of ROK in 1948, superseding the Department of Internal Security (DIS) in charge of Southern Korean armed forces under the United States Army Military Government (USAMGIK) during the Allied occupation era. During Coup d'état of December Twelfth, ministry was occupied by  1st Airborne Special Forces Brigade commanded by Park Hee-do. In 2018, the Ministry has agreed to respect the results from its Special Investigation Committee on Gwangju Uprising in which MD Helicopters MD 500 and UH-1H were used to fire on protesting citizens.

The Ministry of National Defense is allegedly active in military-level censorship such as book banning and screening of mobile apps within the military hierarchy.

Agencies
 Defense Acquisition Program Administration (방위사업청)
 Military Manpower Administration (병무청)

List of ministers

See also

 Conscription in South Korea
 Joint Chiefs of Staff (ROK JCS)
 Republic of Korea Armed Forces (ROKAF)
 Republic of Korea Army (ROKA)
 Republic of Korea Navy (ROKN)
 Republic of Korea Marine Corps (ROKMC)
 Republic of Korea Air Force (ROKAF)

References

External links
 Official website 

South Korea
 
Military of South Korea
National Defense
Yongsan District